João Paulo Santos de Oliveira Gomes, commonly known simply as João Paulo (born 25 May 1989) is a Brazilian football defender currently playing for São Cristóvão de Futebol e Regatas.

Club career
Born in Rio de Janeiro, João Paulo played futsal in his early career, and it was there that he caught the attention of CR Vasco da Gama scouts that brought him to their youth team in 2007. In 2009, he was promoted to senior, however he spent most of the time playing in the reserves squad of the major Carioca team.  In 2010, he left Vasco and joined Tombense, but already that summer he was on his way abroad to Portugal by joining Portimonense SC.  He made 3 appearances in the 2010–11 Primeira Liga and after that season he returned to Brazil.

In 2012, he was playing with Cabofriense in the Campeonato Carioca Série B.  In summer 2012 after passing trials, he would return to Europe by joining Serbian side FK Smederevo.

References

1989 births
Living people
Footballers from Rio de Janeiro (city)
Brazilian footballers
Brazilian expatriate footballers
Expatriate footballers in Portugal
Expatriate footballers in Serbia
Association football defenders
Association football midfielders
Campeonato Brasileiro Série A players
Campeonato Brasileiro Série D players
Primeira Liga players
CR Vasco da Gama players
Tombense Futebol Clube players
Portimonense S.C. players
Associação Desportiva Cabofriense players
FK Smederevo players
Bonsucesso Futebol Clube players
São Raimundo Esporte Clube footballers
Ipatinga Futebol Clube players
São Cristóvão de Futebol e Regatas players
Resende Futebol Clube players
Olaria Atlético Clube players
Esporte Clube São João da Barra players